Shishu Kunja School & College is a higher secondary school at Cadet College Campus, Jhenaidah Sadar Upazila, Jhenaidah District in Bangladesh. It was established in 1968.

References

Schools in Jhenaidah District